Ketchenerovsky District (Kötçnrä rayon) is an administrative and municipal district (raion), one of the thirteen in the Republic of Kalmykia, Russia. It is located in the northwest of the republic. Its administrative center is the rural locality (a settlement) of Ketchenery. As of the 2010 Census, the total population of the district was 10,622, with the population of Ketchenery accounting for 36.8% of that number.

Geography
The district is located in the northwest of Kalmykia, in the area of the Yergeni hills.

History
The district was established in 1938. Until 1990, it was called Priozyorny District (Kalmyk: , Priozërn rajon).

Administrative and municipal status
Within the framework of administrative divisions, Ketchenerovsky District is one of the thirteen in the Republic of Kalmykia. The district is divided into nine rural administrations which comprise twenty-two rural localities. As a municipal division, the district is incorporated as Ketchenerovsky Municipal District. Its nine rural administrations are incorporated as nine rural settlements within the municipal district. The settlement of Ketchenery serves as the administrative center of both the administrative and municipal district.

References

Notes

Sources

Districts of Kalmykia
 
States and territories established in 1938